is a passenger railway station in the city of Yachiyo, Chiba, Japan, operated by the private railway operator Keisei Electric Railway.

Lines
Yachiyodai Station is served by the Keisei Main Line, and is located 36.6 km from the Tokyo terminus of the Keisei Main Line at Keisei-Ueno Station.

Station layout
The station has two island platforms connected by an elevated station building.

Platforms

History
Yachiyodai Station opened on 20 March 1956. The East Exit of the station was completed in 1968, and the new elevated station building in 1969. The station building was renovated in 1993.

Station numbering was introduced to all Keisei Line stations on 17 July 2010. Yachiyodai Station was assigned station number KS29.

Passenger statistics
In fiscal 2019, the station was used by an average of 45,975 passengers daily.

Surrounding area
 Yachiyo City Office, Yachiyodai sub-office

See also
 List of railway stations in Japan

References

External links

 Keisei Station layout 

Railway stations in Japan opened in 1956
Railway stations in Chiba Prefecture
Keisei Main Line
Yachiyo, Chiba